Woodstock Sports Football Club was an English football team based in Sittingbourne, Kent, last played in the Southern Counties East League.

During the summer of 2015 the club announced that due to financial difficulties they would cease to exist.

History
The club was founded in 1961 as Teynham & Lynsted originally competing in local leagues and then the Kent County League. The club were founder members of the Kent County League Premier Division. In 1998 Teynham & Lynsted amalgamated with local rivals Norton Sports. Norton Sports were established in 1927 and competed as a junior club in local leagues. Although Teynham & Lynsted were the senior team, as the team were to be playing at Norton Sports ground, Norton Park, the amalgamation was undertaken in the name of Norton Sports. Norton Sports continued playing in the Kent County League and gained promotion to the Kent League in March 2008 under the management of Ben Taylor, in a season that saw 23 wins out of a possible 26, with just one game lost.

Promotion to the Kent League meant the club had to move away from Norton Park as the ground was nowhere near up to standard. The club intended to move to Woodstock Park in Sittingbourne, but until Woodstock Park was developed they would have to ground share outside the area at Herne Bay.

Norton Sports played at Herne Bay’s ground Winch's Field for just over 2 years before moving into Woodstock Park in October 2010.

The ground was not the only name change for the start of the 2011–12 season as Norton Sports changed their name to Woodstock Sports. The club's name change reflects the club's permanent re-location back to the Sittingbourne area and to Woodstock.

Colours and crest
Since the amalgamation of Teynham & Lysted and Norton Sports, the club's home shirts were Argentina blue and white stripes and black shorts. In the summer of 2013 the club decided to change the home kit to all navy blue. All red is the template used for away shirts and shorts.

Woodstock Sports used the Old Oak F.C. coat of arms as its club crest with "Woodstock" replacing the words "Old Oak F.C." at the top of the shield. The motto at the bottom of the crest read "From little acorns" in Latin, the saying continued "the mighty oak will grow".

Stadium
Woodstock Sports played their home games at Woodstock Park, Broadoak Road, Sittingbourne, Kent, ME9 8AG.

The ground was home to both Woodstock Sports and Sittingbourne F.C. who play in the Isthmian League South Division. Originally, the ground was home of Woodstock Park F.C. who decided to resign from the Kent Invicta Football League in the summer of 2013 allowing Sittingbourne F.C. to move to the stadium.

The western part of the stadium houses the clubhouse with two licensed bars, kitchen, changing rooms, physio room and offices. The ground also has a tea/coffee/food bar and parking.

A covered stand was installed behind goal on the south side of the pitch with 150 spectator seats during the 2012–13 season. If expansion is required in the future, then the capacity on the south side of the pitch can be increased to 300 seats under current planning permission. The west side of the pitch features mostly hard standing so not to spoil the views from the club house, and covered terracing towards the north end of the pitch which was installed during the 2012–13 season. The north side of the pitch features hard standing, a covered stand (moved from Bourne Park Stadium in the summer of 2013) and a changing block incorporating public toilets. The east side of the pitch houses the dugouts only.

The ground's floodlights are erected on four pylons and are of a standard that allows use up to Football Conference.

Honours

* As Teynham & Lynsted
** As Norton Sports

Records

Highest League Position: 8th in Kent League 2011–12
F.A Cup best Performance: First qualifying round 2010–11
F.A. Vase best performance: First round 2011–12

References

External links
Official website

Sport in Sittingbourne
1961 establishments in England
2015 disestablishments in England
Association football clubs established in 1961
Association football clubs disestablished in 2015
Defunct football clubs in Kent
Defunct football clubs in England